Duke Dao may refer to these rulers of ancient China:

Duke Dao of Jin (586–558 BC)
Duke Dao of Cao ( 6th century BC)
Duke Dao of Qi (died 485 BC)
Duke Dao of Qin (died 477 BC)

See also
King Dao (disambiguation)